Hungary women's national bandy team is competing for Hungary in the international bandy tournaments. 

The team has so far only made appearances in two world championship tournaments, in 2007 (as the host country) and 2008 (in Sweden). It has lost all matches without scoring.

See also
Bandy
Rink bandy
Women's Bandy World Championship
Great Britain women's national bandy team
Sweden women's national bandy team
Russia women's national bandy team
Finland women's national bandy team
Norway women's national bandy team
Switzerland women's national bandy team
China women's national bandy team
Canada women's national bandy team
United States women's national bandy team
Soviet Union women's national bandy team

References

External links 
Hungarian Bandy Federation Official Homepage (in Hungarian)

National bandy teams
Bandy
Bandy in Hungary